The ochre-breasted foliage-gleaner (Anabacerthia lichtensteini) is a species of bird in the family Furnariidae. It is found in the southern Atlantic Forest and neighboring areas of southern Brazil. Its natural habitat is subtropical or tropical moist lowland forest.

References

ochre-breasted foliage-gleaner
Birds of the Atlantic Forest
Birds of Brazil
ochre-breasted foliage-gleaner
Taxonomy articles created by Polbot